Juss may refer to:

Satvinder S. Juss (fl. 1990s–2020s), English professor of law

Juss (given name), a masculine given name

Juss., Antoine Laurent de Jussieu (1748–1836), French botanist
A.Juss., Adrien-Henri de Jussieu (1797–1853), French botanist
Ant.Juss., Antoine de Jussieu (1686–1758), French naturalist, botanist, and physician
J.Juss., Joseph de Jussieu (1704–1779), French botanist

Lord Juss, chief lord of Demonland in the 1922 E. R. Eddison novel, The Worm Ouroboros

See also
 Jus (disambiguation)